Daugavpils Satiksme is the public transport corporation which operates tram and bus systems in the eastern Latvian city of Daugavpils.

Two municipal public transport companies existed before 1 January 2014; A/S "Tramvaju uzņēmums" (Tramway Enterprise JSC) and SIA "Daugavpils autobusu parks".

Buses
The autobus network currently comprises 26 routes. In 2021 the purchase of 35 compressed natural gas powered buses was approved, to be supported by the Cohesion Fund.

Bus routes

Tramways
The tram network was opened on 5 November 1946 and a second line was opened in 1950 and extended in 1951 and 1958. Further extensions followed in 1965, 1990 and 2020. It comprises approximately 25 kilometres of track and four lines, the fourth opening within existing infrastructure in January 2022.
 
An uncommon characteristic is the use of trolley poles for current collection. Green track is extensively used throughout. Tramcars are stored outside at a depot on Butļerova Street.

Tram network

Rolling stock

In 2020 a realignment servicing the Daugavpils Regional Hospital opened. This project saw the introduction of the first pantograph equipped cars.

Future projects
In February 2016 the Ministry of Transport announced plans for the construction of a new tram line. Preliminary plans call for a connection between the Jaunforštadte area in the north of the city and the centre of the network, in the vicinity of Daugavpils Station. The route is projected to increase the number of tram passengers to around 500 000 per year. The project was cancelled in 2022.

In September 2020, the Municipal Council of Daugavpils considered an allocation of 24,000 euros for the subsequent implementation of the project for the construction of a new tramline, which supposedly will connect the “Jaunstropi” district with the “Ķimiķu ciemats” district. Czech Pragoimex trams will be assembled locally at the Daugavpils Locomotive Repair Plant (DLRR) as part of the project which will for the first time connect two separate lines.

Gallery

See also
 Daugavpils Airport

References

External links 
 
Official website of Daugavpils satiksme 
Former website of the tram company 
Daugavpils Tramway on TransPhoto 
 Daugavpils on public-transport.net

Tram transport in Latvia
Transport in Daugavpils
Bus companies of Latvia
Railway lines opened in 1946